Paplinek  is a village in the administrative district of Gmina Kowiesy, within Skierniewice County, Łódź Voivodeship, in central Poland.

The village has an approximate population of 60.

References

Paplinek